Nowjeh Deh-e Olya (also Romanized as Nowjeh Deh-e ‘Olyā; also known as Nowgadī Yūkhārī, Nowjeh Deh, Nowjeh Deh-e Karīmī, Nowjeh Deh Karīmī, Nowjeh Deh-ye Bālā, Nowjeh Deh-ye Karīmī, Nugady, Nūjeh Deh-e Karīmī, and Yukāri Nugadi) is a village in Peyghan Chayi Rural District, in the Central District of Kaleybar County, East Azerbaijan Province, Iran. At the 2006 census, its population was 581, in 121 families.   According to a more recent and, perhaps, reliable statistics the population is 658 people in 177 families, which indicates a rapid increase in the number of household. This trend is in good agreement with the population dynamics of villages in Arasbaran region.

References 

Populated places in Kaleybar County